Harriet(t) may refer to:

 Harriet (name), a female name (includes list of people with the name)

Places
Harriet, Queensland, rural locality in Australia
 Harriet, Arkansas, unincorporated community in the United States
 Harriett, Texas, unincorporated community in the United States

Ships
Harriet (1798 ship), built at Pictou Shipyard, Nova Scotia, Canada
Harriet (1802 EIC ship), East India Company ship
Harriet (1810 ship), American ship
Harriet (1813 ship), American ship 
Harriet (1829 ship), British Royal Navy ship
Harriet (1836 ship), British ship
Harriet (fishing smack), 1893 British trawler preserved in Fleetwood Museum

Other
 Harriet (band), an alternative Americana band from Los Angeles
 Harriet (film), a 2019 biographical film about Harriet Tubman
 Harriet the Spy (TV series), a 2021 animated TV series
 List of storms named Harriet

See also 
 
 Harriot (disambiguation)
 Harry (disambiguation)
 Harriette